Chinle Creek is a tributary stream of the San Juan River in Apache County, Arizona and San Juan County, Utah. Its name is derived from the Navajo word ch'inili meaning 'where the waters came out.

See also
List of rivers of Arizona
List of rivers of Utah

References

External links

Tributaries of the Colorado River in Arizona
Tributaries of the Colorado River in Utah
Colorado Plateau
Rivers of Apache County, Arizona
Rivers of San Juan County, Utah
Geography of the Navajo Nation
Rivers of Arizona
Rivers of Utah
Washes of Arizona